Hemibarbus longirostris is a species of small freshwater fish in the family Cyprinidae. It is found in Japan, the Korean Peninsula and China.

References

 

Hemibarbus
Fish described in 1908